Splendrillia falsa is a species of sea snail, a marine gastropod mollusk in the family Drilliidae.

Description
The length of the shell attains 9.5 mm, its diameter 3.75 mm.

Distribution
This marine species occurs off False Bay, South Africa

References

  Barnard K.H. (1958), Contribution to the knowledge of South African marine Mollusca. Part 1. Gastropoda; Prosobranchiata: Toxoglossa; Annals of The South African Museum v. 44 pp. 73–163

External links
  Tucker, J.K. 2004 Catalog of recent and fossil turrids (Mollusca: Gastropoda). Zootaxa 682:1–1295.

Endemic fauna of South Africa
falsa
Gastropods described in 1958